Cheng Yuk Han Bjork (born 21 June 1980) is a fencer from Hong Kong, China who won three bronze medals in the women's épée team competition at the 2002 Busan Asian Games, 2006 Asian Games and 2010 Asian Games.

She attended Kit Sam Secondary School and is a physiotherapy graduate from the Hong Kong Polytechnic University.

Hong Kong Elite Athlete Association http://hk.myblog.yahoo.com/hkeaa_chengyukhan

1980 births
Living people
Hong Kong female épée fencers
Place of birth missing (living people)
Asian Games medalists in fencing
Fencers at the 2002 Asian Games
Fencers at the 2006 Asian Games
Fencers at the 2010 Asian Games
Asian Games bronze medalists for Hong Kong
Medalists at the 2002 Asian Games
Medalists at the 2006 Asian Games
Medalists at the 2010 Asian Games
Alumni of Hong Kong Baptist University
21st-century Hong Kong women